Lion's Den is a 1988 short film directed by Bryan Singer and John Ottman. It marks Singer's first film as a director. The film is about five men who meet up at their old hang-out spot after finishing their first semester of college. The film is 25 minutes in length. Ethan Hawke, who had known Bryan Singer as a child in New Jersey, agreed to star in it at the same time that he was filming Dad with Jack Lemmon. Ottman also edited the film.

Cast
Bryan Singer as Michael
Susan Kussman as Cathy
Ethan Hawke as Chris
Dylan Kussman as Kyle
Brandon Keith as Darren
David Leslie Conhaim as Dean
Jim Napoli as Costumer
Anthony Miller as Diner Chef

References

External links

1988 films
1988 short films
American comedy short films
Films directed by John Ottman
Films directed by Bryan Singer
Films produced by Bryan Singer
Films with screenplays by Bryan Singer
1980s English-language films
1980s American films